The Space Research Centre (SRC) is an interdisciplinary research institute of the Polish Academy of Sciences. It was established in 1977. SRC PAS  is the only institute in Poland whose activity is fully dedicated to the research of terrestrial space, the Solar System and the Earth using space technology and satellite techniques.

The SRC also acted as Poland's national space agency until the Polish Space Agency (POLSA) was fully established in 2014.

Since 1977 the SRC staff developed, constructed and prepared for launch over 60 instruments and participated in the experiments in more than 50 space missions, for example: European Space Agency's Cassini–Huygens mission (investigation of Saturn and Titan), INTEGRAL (space laboratory of high energy astrophysics), Mars Express (Mars orbiter), Rosetta (mission to comet), Venus Express (Venus orbiter), Herschel Space Observatory (investigation of the coldest and most distant objects in the Universe), BepiColombo (mission to Mercury), Roscosmos's  Koronas-F, Koronas-I, Koronas-Foton and Fobos-Grunt missions, and CNES' DEMETER and TARANIS missions. Space Research Centre has co-operated with the ESA since 1991. SRC has also collaborated with NASA (IBEX mission) and ISRO (Chandrayaan programme).

Organisation structure
The Space Research Centre is composed of multiple R&D facilities spread across locations in Warsaw, Wrocław, as well as Borówiec near Poznań.

Research groups
 Solar Physics Division
 Laboratory for Solar System Physics and Astrophysics
 Solar System Dynamics and Planetology Laboratory
 Plasma Physics Laboratory
 Planetary Geodesy Division
 Earth Observation Laboratory

Engineering groups
 Micromechanical and Photonics Laboratory
 Electronic Constructions Laboratory
 Space Mechatronics and Robotics Laboratory
 Laboratory of Satellite Applications of FPGA

See also
Polish Astronomical Society
List of government space agencies

External links

 

Science and technology in Poland
Institutes of the Polish Academy of Sciences